This is a list of diplomatic missions in Costa Rica. There are currently 38 embassies in San José.

Embassies in San José

Other missions in San José

 (Trade Office)

Gallery

Consular missions

Ciudad Quesada
 (Consulate General)

Limón
 (Consulate General)

Sarapiquí
 (Consulate General)

Non-resident embassies

In Mexico City except if noted otherwise

 (Bogota)
 (Havana)

 (Washington, D.C.)
 (New York City)
 (Panama City)

 (New York City)
 (New York City)
 (New York City)
 (New York City)

 (Havana)
 (Havana)
 (Washington, DC)
 (Bogotá) 
 (Washington, DC)
 (Bogota)
 (Havana)
 (Panama City)
 (Washington, DC)
 (Havana)
 (New York City)
 (New York City)

 (New York City)
 (New York City)
 (Washington, DC)
 (Havana)
 (New York City)

 (Panama City)
 (New York City)
 (Panama City)
 (Panama City)
 (Managua)
 

 (New York City)

 (Washington, DC)
 (Panama City)
 (Washington, DC)
 (Havana)
 (Bogota)
 (Ottawa)
 (Managua)
 (New York City)
 (Havana)
 (New York City)
 (Washington, DC)

 (Guatemala City)
 (New York City)
 (Washington, DC)
 (New York City)
 (Bogotá)
 (Washington, DC)

 (Managua)

 (Panama City)
 
 (Washington, DC)

 (Washington, DC)
 (New York City)

 (Lima)
 (New York City)
 (Panama City)
 (Singapore)
 (Guatemala City)
 (Washington, DC)
 (Caracas)
 (Washington, DC)
 (Washington, DC)
 (Washington, DC)
 (Santiago)  
 (Washington, DC)
 (New York City)
 (Washington, DC)
 (Washington, DC)
 
 (Washington, DC)

 (Washington, DC)
 
 (Panama City)
 (Washington, DC)
 (Havana)
 (Washington, DC)
 (Havana)

Former missions 
 
  (closed in 2011) 
  (closed in 1991) 
  (closed in 2015)

See also
 Foreign relations of Costa Rica
 List of diplomatic missions of Costa Rica
 Visa requirements for Costa Rican citizens

References

 Ministry of Foreign Affairs of Costa Rica (Spanish)

Foreign relations of Costa Rica
Costa Rica
Diplomatic missions